The women's cross-country is an event at the annual UCI Mountain Bike & Trials World Championships. It has been held since the inaugural championships in 1990. As of 2009, Gunn-Rita Dahle of Norway is the most successful rider with four gold medals and two silver medal won between 1998 and 2012.

Medalists

Medal table

Medal table by rider

References
Results from the Union Cycliste Internationale's website.

Events at the UCI Mountain Bike & Trials World Championships